The Undercover Economist is a book by Tim Harford published in 2005 by Little, Brown.

The book provides an introduction to principles of economics, including demand-supply interactions, market failures, externalities, globalisation, international trade and comparative advantage. It explains in non-technical terms how Starbucks and other coffee providers price their products, why it is hard to buy a decent used car, why the health insurance system in the United States is failing, and why poor countries remain poor while the People's Republic of China has continuously grown rich in the last couple of decades.

Freakonomics author Steven Levitt called it "a rare specimen: a book on economics that will enthrall...Beautifully written and argued, it brings the power of economics to life."

See also 
 The Logic of Life (2008)

External links
 Official site

Economics books
2006 non-fiction books
Little, Brown and Company books